Khajipet Sunkesula is a village in Kadapa district of the Indian state of Andhra Pradesh. It is located in Khajipet  mandal of Badvel revenue division.

Geography

It has an average elevation of 123 meters (404 feet). The community has a range of castes and religions.

Transport

Khajipeta is supported by the APSRTC, a bus transport company. A National Highway passes through this mandal, but no railway.

References

External links
 GOI Directory

Villages in Kadapa district